Haloxylon salicornicum is a shrub or undershrub belonging to the family Amaranthaceae. It is a desert shrub and is found in Israel, Jordan, Egypt, Saudi Arabia, Kuwait, Oman, United Arab Emirates, Afghanistan and Pakistan.

Description
The stems are pale and the plant lacks large foliage-type leaves, having instead minute triangular cup-shaped scales with membranous margins and woolly interiors. This plant is found in sandhills, sand ridges and other arid habitats.

References

Amaranthaceae
Flora of Saudi Arabia
Flora of Pakistan
Flora of Afghanistan
Taxa named by Alfred Moquin-Tandon
Taxa named by Alexander von Bunge
Taxa named by Pierre Edmond Boissier